The Minister of Infrastructure and Communities is the Minister of the Crown in the Canadian Cabinet who is responsible for the development of Canada's infrastructure. Infrastructure Canada and the Canada Infrastructure Bank report directly to the Minister of Infrastructure and Communities.

History 
From 2006 to 2013, infrastructure and communities was the responsibility of the Minister of Transport, which was informally styled Minister of Transport, Infrastructure, and Communities. From 2013 to 2015, infrastructure and communities was the responsibility of the Minister of Intergovernmental Affairs, then styled Minister of Infrastructure, Communities and Intergovernmental Affairs. (Technically, the portfolios of infrastructure and intergovernmental affairs were both the responsibility of the President of the Queen's Privy Council for Canada). From 2015 to 2021, during the 29th Canadian Ministry, the portfolio was assigned its own ministry.

List of ministers
Key:

See also
Infrastructure Canada

References

External links
Department of Infrastructure Canada

Infrastructure and Communities